Pavey is an English surname. Notable people with the surname include:

Alfie Pavey (born 1995), British footballer
Bill Pavey (1913–1982), Australian rules footballer
Celia Pavey, birth name of Vera Blue (born 1994), Australian musician
Charles W. Pavey (1835–1910), American businessman and politician
Iris Pavey Gilmore (1900-1982), American author
Jo Pavey (born 1973), British long-distance runner
Kenny Pavey (born 1979), British footballer
Max Pavey (1918–1957), American chess master and medical doctor
Melinda Pavey (born 1969), Australian politician
Şafak Pavey (born 1976), Turkish diplomat, columnist and politician
Simon Pavey (born 1967), Australian off-road motorcycle racer
Stanley Pavey (1913–1984), British cinematographer
Blake Pavey (Born 2002), Australian Comedian